Scott Friedman may refer to:

 Scott L. Friedman (born 1955), American scientist, professor, and physician
 Scott E. Friedman (born 1958), American author and attorney